Laughing Matter is the fifth studio album by American band Wand. It was released on April 19, 2019 through Drag City Records.

Accolades

Track listing

Personnel
Sourced from AllMusic.

Wand
 Cory Hanson
 Robert Cody - guitar, guitars, Korg synthesizer, Mellotron, prepared piano, handclapping
 Sofia Arreguin - vocals, Mellotron, Minimoog, piano, Roland Juno 6, Wurlitzer, percussion
 Lee Landey - bass, field recording, Korg synthesizer, Minimoog, Prophet synthesizer
 Evan Burrows - vocals, drums, percussion, field recording, Korg synthesizer

Charts

References

2019 albums
Drag City (record label) albums
Wand (band) albums